Aleksandr Vladimirovich Karshakevich (born 6 April 1959 in Ashmyany, Hrodna Voblast) is a former Soviet/Belarusian handball player who competed in the 1980 Summer Olympics and in the 1988 Summer Olympics.

In 1980, he won the silver medal with the Soviet team. He played four matches including the final and scored 13 goals.

Eight years later he won the gold medal with the Soviet team. He played five matches including the final and scored twenty goals.

External links
 

1959 births
Living people
People from Ashmyany
Soviet male handball players
Belarusian male handball players
Handball players at the 1980 Summer Olympics
Handball players at the 1988 Summer Olympics
Olympic handball players of the Soviet Union
Olympic gold medalists for the Soviet Union
Olympic silver medalists for the Soviet Union
Olympic medalists in handball
Medalists at the 1988 Summer Olympics
Medalists at the 1980 Summer Olympics
Sportspeople from Grodno Region